Supermodel po-ukrainsky, cycle 3 was the third season of Supermodel po-ukrainsky. The season premiered on August 26, 2016. All former judges returned for this season. In contrast to the previous two seasons, the show introduced a division of contestants by teams, as well as 'elimination battles' for contestants in the bottom two to help determine who would get eliminated.

The winner of the competition was 18-year-old Maria Grebenyuk. As part of her prizes, she received the opportunity to star on the cover of Pink Magazine in Ukraine, as well as become the face of Fresh Fashion Day of Ukrainian Fashion Week 2017, a contracts with K Models and a trip to New York City.

Darya Maystrenko, Irina Rotar, Katya Svinarchuk, Oleksandra Litvin and Sasha Kugat would later return to compete for the tile in Top Model po-ukrainsky, cycle 7. Katya Svinarchuk was eliminated in Episode 1. Darya Maystrenko was eliminated in Episode 4 and was brought back in Episode 7. Irina Rotar was eliminated in Episode 5. Sasha Kugat quit the competition in Episode 7. Darya Maystrenko and Sasha Litvin finished as runner-ups.

Contestants 
(ages stated are at start of contest)

Episodes

Episode 1
Original airdate: 

This was the first casting episode.

Episode 2
Original airdate: 

Bottom two/eliminated: Vika Globa & Yuliya Shchedrina

Episode 3
Original airdate: 

Bottom two: Anna Tihomirova & Olga Golub	
Eliminated: Anna Tihomirova

Episode 4
Original airdate: 

Bottom two: Alina Milyayeva & Yulya Chornobil	
Eliminated: Yulya Chornobil

Episode 5
 Original airdate: 

Bottom two: Emi Greys & Olga Golub
Eliminated: Olga Golub

Episode 6
 Original airdate: 

Immune: Sveta Kosovska
Bottom two: Alina Milyayeva & Ira Rotar 
Eliminated: Alina Milyayeva

Episode 7
Original airdate: 

Bottom two: Emi Greys & Sveta Kosovska
Eliminated: Emi Greys

Episode 8
Original airdate: 

Immune: Dasha Maystrenko 
Bottom two: Ira Rotar & Sasha Kugat
Eliminated: Ira Rotar

Episode 9
Original airdate: 

Casting winner: Katya Svinarchuk
Bottom two: Yulya Mochalova & Sveta Kosovska
Eliminated: None

Episode 10
Original airdate: 

Immune: Sveta Kosovska & Masha Hrebenyuk
Bottom two: Yulya Mochalova & Katya Svinarchuk
Eliminated: Yulya Mochalova

Episode 11
Original airdate: 

Bottom two: Masha Hrebenyuk & Sveta Kosovska
Eliminated: Masha Hrebenyuk

Episode 12
Original airdate: 

Eliminated: Sasha Kugat

Episode 13
Original airdate: 

Returned: Masha Hrebenyuk
Eliminated outside of judging panel: Sasha Livtin

After that, the final 4 flown to Munich.

Eliminated: Katya Svinarchuk

Episode 14
Original airdate: 

Eliminated: None

Episode 15
Original airdate: 

Final three: Dasha Maystrenko, Masha Hrebenyuk & Sveta Kosovska
Eliminated: Sveta Kosovska
Final two: Dasha Maystrenko & Masha Hrebenyuk
Ukraine's Next Top Model:  Masha Hrebenyuk

Summaries

Results

 The contestant was eliminated.
 The contestant was in the bottom two.
 The contestant was immune from elimination. 
 The contestant was originally eliminated, but was saved.
 The contestant was eliminated outside of judging panel.
 The contestant won the competition.

Photo shoot guide 

Episode 2 photo shoot: Posing with light sticks
Episode 3 photo shoot: Inner World, Sports luxe in a stadium
Episode 4 photo shoot: Acrobats with a male model
Episode 5 photo shoot: Legs, Ice hockey players
Episode 6 photo shoot: Posing on geometric shapes,Auto-washing
Episode 7 photo shoot: Pin-up girls at a factory, Light in the darkness
Episode 8 photo shoot: Lingerie in pairs
Episode 9 photo shoot: Social media PSA
Episode 10 photo shoot: Underwater fabric
Episode 11 photo shoot: Seven deadly sins
Episode 12 photo shoot: Cake body paint with male models, in vacuum space
Episode 13 photo shoot: Steampunk fashion
Episode 14 photo shoot: Photo shoot in the electric train; Five different backgrounds during 10 minutes; General photo shoot in the time mechanism; Salvador Dali's style
Episode 15 photo shoot: Slavic mythology

Judges
 Alla Kostromichova (host & head judge) - model
 Sergey Nikityuk (judge) - model scout
 Sonya Plakidyuk (judge) - fashion photographer
 Richard Gorn (judge) - fashion director

References

External links
Official website

Ukraine
2016 Ukrainian television seasons